Kaa-Khemsky District (also Kaa-Khemskiy) (Kaa-Xem kojuun) is an administrative and municipal district (raion, or kozhuun), one of the seventeen in the Tuva Republic, Russia. It is located in the center and east of the republic. Its administrative center is the rural locality (a selo) of Saryg-Sep. Population:  13,071 (2002 Census);  The population of Saryg-Sep accounts for 36.0% of the district's total population.

References

Notes

Sources

Districts of Tuva